Olivia Caroline Bloomfield, Baroness Bloomfield of Hinton Waldrist (born 30 June 1960) is a British life peer and member of the House of Lords.

Education
She was educated at United World College of the Atlantic and read Philosophy, Politics and Economics (PPE) at St Hugh's College, Oxford.

Career
Bloomfield was a governor at The Cheltenham Ladies' College from 2003 to 2009. She has worked for Bank of America, and then as a headhunter with a company known as Russell Reynolds Associates. She worked for the Conservative party at Conservative Campaign Headquarters from approximately 2007 to 2010, and for this time, reported to Michael Spencer, the Conservative treasurer from 2007 to 2010. Her role was varied, but she was hired to help raise funds for the 2010 general election, which also meant dealing with the party's then £8.5m deficit. The Daily Mirror reported that they believed The Leader's Group, a secretive group of high-value donors who had regular meetings with David Cameron, was run by Bloomfield.

In January 2018, British Investigative magazine Private Eye reported Bloomfield had been forced to admit she had overlooked a personal connection when she had praised the "high standards of reporting and transparency" of financial services offered in the Cayman Islands. According to the magazine, she was later forced to admit that "a close family member is a director of a financial services company domiciled in the Cayman Islands".

Bloomfield has held a post as a magistrate. She is also Chairman of the Pump House Project, an arts and parkour centre in her home town of Faringdon. She was also, for a time, a partner at the Atlantic Superconnection Corporation, a fund which plans to build an electric cable between Iceland and the UK.

She was nominated for a life peerage as part of David Cameron's Resignation Honours and was created Baroness Bloomfield of Hinton Waldrist, of Hinton Waldrist in the County of Oxfordshire, on 5 September 2016.

References

÷

1960 births
Living people
People educated at Atlantic College
Alumni of St Hugh's College, Oxford
Conservative Party (UK) life peers
Bank of America people
Magistrates' courts in England and Wales
Life peeresses created by Elizabeth II